Prospère Mushobekwa Nyalukemba is the former president of the Provincial Assembly of Sud-Kivu (until 2004), and a former mayor of Bukavu.

See also
 Bukavu history and timeline	
 List of mayors of Bukavu

References

Living people
Mayors of Bukavu
Year of birth missing (living people)